In the Chicago mayoral election of 1863, Democrat Francis Cornwall Sherman won reelection, defeating National Union (Republican) nominee Thomas Barbour Bryan by an extremely narrow quarter percent margin.

Background
In 1862, Sherman had appointed a committee which recommended that Chicago pass a new city charter which would annex Bridgeport and Holstein, lengthen the terms for mayor, treasurer, collector, city attorney, and clerk of police each from one to two years. Ultimately, such a charter and measures came to pass before the 1863 mayoral election. This made 1863 the first mayoral election held to a two-year term.

Since his 1862 mayoral victory, Sherman had, in October 1862, lost a congressional election to Isaac N. Arnold.

The election was held on April 21. It was the third of four Chicago mayoral elections which took place during the course of the American Civil War.

Tensions between the two parties were strong in the spring of 1863. Alderman Charles C. P. Holden (Sherman's 1862 mayoral opponent) had introduced several resolutions which Sherman vetoed for being too partisan. Republicans sought to see Democrats provide greater support for war measures, while Democrats were critical of President Lincoln's handling of the war. At the time the Common Council's swing vote was Alderman Shimp, a Democrat voted with the Republicans.

Campaigning
The Republican (National Union) party nominated Thomas Barbour Bryan. He had previously been an unsuccessful candidate in the 1861 mayoral election. The Democratic Party renominated Mayor Sherman.

Bryan had been a reluctant candidate, as was the case when he ran in 1861.

Sherman's candidacy benefited immensely from the support of Irish and German voters from the newly-annexed neighborhoods of the city.

The Chicago Tribune characterized Sherman as being sound in his position on the war, but criticized his affiliation with the Chicago Times and copperheads.

The Bridgeport ward of Chicago was nicknamed the "Egypt of Chicago". Democrats believed the ward alone would secure Sherman's victory, a prediction which ultimately proved true.

Results
With the exception of the nullified March 1844 mayoral election, Sherman's margin of victory was the narrowest in Chicago mayoral election history.

By winning this election, Sherman became the first individual to be elected to three terms as mayor of Chicago.

In the Common Council elections held simultaneously, nineteen Democrats and twelve Republicans were elected, with an additional seat being vacant. Nearly the entire Democratic ticket was elected by majorities between 250 and 300 votes.

Controversy
With a narrow vote, Republicans claimed that the Democrats had won through electoral fraud. They appointed a committee to investigate, and Bryan notified Sherman that he would contest the result.

Ultimately, Bryan did not contest. While he believed that he had received a majority of the legal votes, and was pressured by friends to contest the election he was not greatly enough concerned about the result of the election to pursue the process of contesting it.

References

Mayoral elections in Chicago
Chicago
Chicago
1860s in Chicago